is a Japanese footballer who plays as a defender.

International career
Morita has represented Japan at under-15 and under-16 level.

Career statistics

Club
.

Notes

References

External links

2003 births
Living people
Association football people from Niigata Prefecture
Japanese footballers
Japan youth international footballers
Association football defenders
J3 League players
Albirex Niigata players
FC Tokyo players
FC Tokyo U-23 players